Falevi Umutaua is a Samoan professional football manager.

Career
In 2007, he coached the Samoa national football team.

References

External links
Profile at Soccerway.com
Profile at Soccerpunter.com

Year of birth missing (living people)
Living people
Samoan football managers
Samoa national football team managers
Place of birth missing (living people)